Binasco is a comune (municipality) in the Province of Milan in the Italian region Lombardy, located about  southwest of Milan.

Binasco borders the following municipalities: Zibido San Giacomo, Noviglio, Lacchiarella, Vernate, Casarile.

The coffee machine manufacturer Gruppo Cimbali SpA is based in Binasco.

History 

On May 24, 1796, 100 citizens of Binasco were executed and the village was burned at the orders of French general Napoleon Bonaparte in response to the inhabitants revolting against French occupation of Northern Italy.

Demographic evolution

References

External links
 Official website
 Espresso machine Uk

Cities and towns in Lombardy